Sunset to Dawn is a studio album by American pianist Kenny Barron which was recorded in 1973 and first released on the Muse label.

Reception

In his review on Allmusic, Scott Yanow notes "Kenny Barron could easily go unidentified if some of the selections on this LP were played for a listener during a "blindfold test" – he sounds quite unrecognizable on the three numbers on which he plays electric piano. Barron, who is joined by electric bassist Bob Cranshaw, drummer Freddie Waits, and the colorful percussion of both Richard Landrum and Warren Smith on his five originals and one by Waits, utilizes electricity with intelligence and creativity. His songs are moody and complex yet somewhat accessible and this underrated set would certainly surprise some of his current fans" In JazzTimes David Zych wrote "The program has Barron offering a rich program of originals with a '70s tinge, but nevertheless rich, imaginative, and worth repeated listenings".

Track listing 
All compositions by Kenny Barron except where noted.

 "Sunset" – 9:08
 "A Flower" – 6:56
 "Swamp Demon" – 4:43
 "Al-Kifha" (Freddie Waits) – 6:17
 "Delores Street, S.F." – 6:43
 "Dawn" – 6:03

Personnel 
Kenny Barron – piano, electric piano
Bob Cranshaw – electric bass 
Freddie Waits – drums
Richard Landrum – congas, percussion
Warren Smith – vibraphone, percussion

References 

Kenny Barron albums
1973 albums
Muse Records albums
Albums produced by Don Schlitten